Tetrix arenosa, known generally as the obscure pygmy grasshopper or obscure grouse locust, is a species of pygmy grasshopper in the family Tetrigidae. It is found in North America.

Subspecies
These two subspecies belong to the species Tetrix arenosa:
 Tetrix arenosa angusta (Hancock, 1896)
 Tetrix arenosa arenosa Burmeister, 1838

References

External links

 

arenosa
Articles created by Qbugbot
Insects described in 1838
Taxa named by Hermann Burmeister